= Farzaneh Sharifi =

First female Iranian urologist

- فرزانه شریفی
- Born: 1961
- Alma mater: University of Tehran
- Occupation: Urologist

Farzaneh Sharifi, also known as Farzaneh Sharifi-Aqdas (in Persian: فرزانه شریفی), born in 1961, is the first Iranian female urologist.

Throughout a long career as a researcher and physician, she has pioneered treatments for urinary incontinence and was the first to introduce numerous medical innovations to the Middle East, such as the use of electrical treatments to address urological issues.

== Biography ==
Farzaneh Sharifi was born in 1961 and is the fourth child of a judge who took a particular interest in the education of his children. After starting in 1979, and completing her studies at the University of Tehran in 1986–1987, she studied under a physician named Simforoush, who helped her further deepen her knowledge. She married in 1981 and had two children, a son and a daughter.

In the 2000s to 2010s, she was involved in research on polymers for urology. Generally, she particularly focused on the use of treatments for urinary issues and introduced the first urological treatments using electricity in the Middle East.

In 2016, her contributions to the field were praised at the 1st International Urology Congress. In 2017 and 2022, she presided over the Iranian congress of urology.
